

Administrative and municipal divisions

References

Penza Oblast
Penza Oblast